The Kanuni Sultan Suleiman bridge, also known as Büyükçekmece Bridge, is a stone arch bridge located in Büyükçekmece,  west of the center of Istanbul, Turkey, on the European side of the Bosphorus.

The bridge was built during the Ottoman period by chief architect Mimar Sinan (c. 1488/1490–1588), across the mouth of the large but shallow inlet known as Lake Büyükçekmece. Construction started in 1566 and the bridge opened in 1567.

The bridge comprises 28 spans and is divided into four sections by the presence of three shallow islets along its length.   Its role serving large volumes of traffic as a communications artery has been taken over by a wide modern road bridge on its seaward side, but the sixteenth-century bridge is promoted for its symbolic and historic resonances.   Between 1986 and 1989 it was restored at considerable cost.

References

Arch bridges in Turkey
Stone bridges in Turkey
Mimar Sinan buildings
Bridges completed in 1567
Ottoman bridges in Turkey
Buildings and structures in Istanbul Province
Former road bridges in Turkey
Pedestrian bridges in Turkey
Büyükçekmece